This is a list of active chapters, inactive chapters and colonies of the Pi Lambda Phi fraternity.

List of Pi Lambda Phi chapters by state and territory

Alabama

California

Colorado

Connecticut

Delaware

Florida

Illinois

Indiana

Iowa

Kentucky

Maine

Maryland

Massachusetts

Michigan

Minnesota

Missouri

Nebraska

New Hampshire

New Jersey

New Mexico

New York

North Carolina

Ohio

Oklahoma

Pennsylvania

Rhode Island

South Carolina

Texas

Virginia

Washington

Wisconsin

West Virginia

Canada

References

External links 
 Official Homepage

Lists of chapters of United States student societies by society
Pi Lambda Phi